Zəfəran (also, Zə’fəran and Shafran) is a village in Baku, Azerbaijan.

References 

Populated places in Baku